Karate at the 2018 Summer Youth Olympics was held from 17 to 18 October at Europa Pavilion in Buenos Aires, Argentina. This marked the debut of Karate at the Youth Olympics.

Qualification

Each National Olympic Committee (NOC) could enter a maximum of 6 competitors, 3 per gender and one per event. As hosts, Argentina was given 4 quotas, 2 per gender. A further four places, two per gender, were granted by the Tripartite Commission. The remaining 40 places were to be decided in various ways; namely, the Youth Olympic Rankings and two qualification tournaments. Furthermore, all continents are guaranteed at least one athlete representation.

To be eligible to participate in these events, athletes must have been born between 1 January 2001 and 31 December 2002.

Boys

Girls

Summary

Medal summary

Medal table

Boys events

Girls events

References

External links

Official Results Book – Karate

 
2018 Summer Youth Olympics events
Youth Summer Olympics
2018